Bozoó is a municipality and town located in the province of Burgos, Castile and León, Spain. According to the 2004 census (INE), the municipality has a population of 110 inhabitants.

The municipality of Bozoó is made up of three villages: Bozoó (seat or capital), Portilla and Villanueva Soportilla.

References 

Municipalities in the Province of Burgos